James Welsh (29 January 1881 – 16 December 1969) was a Scottish Labour Party politician.

Born in Paisley, Welsh owned a cinemas in Glasgow, and served for many years on Glasgow City Council.  He was elected at the 1929 general election as Member of Parliament (MP) for Paisley, but was defeated at the 1931 general election by the Liberal Party candidate Joseph Maclay.

Long a member of the Independent Labour Party, Welsh resigned in 1933 to join the Scottish Socialist Party.  He served as Lord Provost of Glasgow from 1943 to 1945.  In later life, he was a member of the Arts Council of Great Britain, chairing its Scottish Committee from 1946 to 1951.

Cinemas 
 Parade, in a rented a hall in Alexandria Parade in Dennistoun
 Cinema House, in Church Street, Hamilton, South Lanarkshire

Kingsway Cinema Ltd. 
Welsh was the Cinema Director of Kingsway Cinema Ltd. George Smith was the Manager of Kingsway Cinema Ltd. Both were shareholders of Kingsway Cinema Ltd. 
 New Parade at 200 Meadowpark Street in Dennistoun, built in 1921
 Kingsway Cinema, Cathcart district, on the south side of Glasgow, opened on 8 May 1929
 Riddrie Cinema, 726 Cumbernauld Road, Riddrie
 Mecca Picture House, Balmore Road, Possil, opened in August 1933.

References

Sources

External links 
 

1881 births
1969 deaths
Councillors in Glasgow
Independent Labour Party politicians
Lord Provosts of Glasgow
Members of the Parliament of the United Kingdom for Paisley constituencies
Politicians from Paisley, Renfrewshire
Scottish Labour MPs
UK MPs 1929–1931